Miss France 2022 was the 92nd edition of the Miss France pageant. The competition was held on 11 December 2021 at the Zénith de Caen in Caen, Normandy. Amandine Petit of Normandy crowned Diane Leyre of Île-de-France.

Background

Location
By July 2021, the Zénith de Caen in Caen had confirmed that the venue was scheduled to host the Miss France 2022 competition on 11 December 2021, although this had not been confirmed by the Miss France Committee. On 31 August, it was officially confirmed that the competition would be held at the Zénith de Caen on 11 December.

On 28 August 2021, Sylvie Tellier confirmed that the annual overseas trip for the delegates would return if COVID-19 restrictions allowed for it, with the delegates visiting Réunion. They ultimately did visit Réunion for a variety of events, before going to Caen to begin rehearsals.

Selection of contestants
After having withdrawn from the 2021 edition due to the COVID-19 pandemic, Tahiti returned to the competition. However, Wallis and Futuna withdrew from the competition, after having returned for the first time since 2005 in the 2021 edition. In September 2021, the committee confirmed through their Facebook account that their withdrawal was due to the COVID-19 pandemic in New Caledonia, where the regional committee for Wallis and Futuna was headquartered.

On 17 November, it was confirmed in a press conference that the 29 contestants would be given labour contracts for the first time, amidst controversy regarding the labour laws and unpaid nature of taking part in the competition in past years.

Results

Special awards

Scoring

Preliminaries
A jury composed of partners (internal and external) of the Miss France Committee selected fifteen delegates during an interview that took place on 8 December to advance to the semifinals.

Top 15
In the top fifteen, a 50/50 split vote between the official jury and voting public selected five delegates to advance to the top five. Each delegate was awarded an overall score of 1 to 15 from the jury and public, and the five delegates with the highest combined scores advanced to the top five. The delegates with the sixth and seventh highest combined scores were afterwards designated as the fifth and sixth runners-up, respectively, despite not advancing in the competition. In the case of a tie, the jury vote prevailed.

Top five
In the top five, a 50/50 split vote between the official jury and voting public determined which contestant was declared Miss France. This was the second year that voting was conducted this way, following a rule change in the 2021 edition. Each contestant was ranked from first to fifth by the jury and public, and the two scores were combined to create a total score. In the case of a tie, the public vote prevailed. If this rule change had not occurred, Martinique would have won, while Alsace would have been first runner-up, followed by Île-de-France, Tahiti, and then Normandy.

Pageant

Format
On 17 November, it was announced in a press conference that the theme for this edition of the competition would be musical theatre and musical films, with competition rounds being inspired by various notable musical theatre shows and films.

The competition opened with an introduction themed after The Lion King. The 29 contestants were initially separated into three groups, two consisting of ten contestants and one of nine, with each group taking part in an initial presentation round. The three presentation rounds were themed after Mamma Mia!, Mary Poppins, and West Side Story, respectively. Afterwards, the 29 contestants presented their regional costumes, created by local designers from their home regions, in a round inspired by Singin' in the Rain. The 29 contestants subsequently participated in the one-piece swimsuit round, inspired by La La Land.

After that, the Top 15 were announced, and they competed in the two-piece swimsuit round inspired by Chicago. Then the Top Five were announced and presented their evening gowns in a round inspired by Broadway theatre. After the final question round, the Top Five participated in their final presentation round, inspired by Aladdin, before the final results were revealed.

Judges
Jean-Pierre Pernaut (President of the Jury) – journalist and reporter
François Alu – dancer
Amel Bent – singer and actress
Philippe Lacheau – actor
Inès Reg – comedian
Ahmed Sylla – comedian and actor
Delphine Wespiser – Miss France 2012 from Alsace

Contestants
The 29 delegates were:

Notes

References

External links

December 2021 events in France
Miss France
2021 beauty pageants
Beauty pageants in France
Entertainment events in France
Competitions in France